{{safesubst:#invoke:RfD|||month = March
|day = 20
|year = 2023
|time = 04:57
|timestamp = 20230320045729

|content=
REDIRECT Joker_in_other_media#Joker_(2019)

Internet memes introduced in 2019

}}